Mielec (64 000 inhabitants) located in a very densely populated western part of Podkarpacie and eastern Małopolska and Świętokrzyskie (an agglomeration Tarnobrzeg- Sandomierz- Stalowa Wola of approx. 200 000 inhabitants, 30 kilometers to the north, town of Tarnów, 120 000 inhabitants, 50 kilometres to the west), has a former military and industrial airport managed by the company PZL Cargo, that during the renovation of the runway of Rzeszów airport in December 2004 was intended to be used as a replacement for Rzeszów runway. It offers APV- I instrumental approach and aviation fuel station. Experts estimated that it could handle even large aircraft. Its location offers a chance to serve the parts of Świętokrzyskie and Małoposlska regions, that are otherwise not covered by other airports.

History
The airport opened in 1938.

Airport infrastructure
There exists a railroad line next to the terminal that can be used for passenger service or industry. Airport offers APV- I instrumental approach and aviation fuel station with AVGAS and JET A1 type fuels.

References

External links
 Official website
 Lotnisko Mielec- unofficial website

Airports in Poland
Mielec
Buildings and structures in Podkarpackie Voivodeship